"Beginnings" is a song written by Robert Lamm for the rock band Chicago Transit Authority and recorded for its debut album Chicago Transit Authority, released in 1969. The song is the band's second single (after "Questions 67 and 68"), but failed to chart on its initial release.

After the band's success with subsequent singles, "Beginnings" was re-released in June 1971, backed with "Colour My World". Both sides became U.S. radio hits, and the combined single climbed to number seven on the U.S. Billboard Hot 100 singles chart. "Beginnings" reached number one on the U.S. Easy Listening chart. Writing for Ultimate Classic Rock, Dave Swanson rates "Beginnings" as number two in his list of top ten Chicago songs. It has been covered by many bands, including the tribute band Leonid and Friends.

Composition
Robert Lamm said "Beginnings" was inspired by a performance by Richie Havens that he attended at the Ash Grove music club in Los Angeles when the group moved to that area. In a 2013 interview he said he composed it on a twelve-string guitar that was missing the two low E strings.

Chart performance

Weekly charts

Year-end charts

Personnel
 Robert Lamm - lead vocals, keyboards
 Terry Kath - 12 string acoustic guitar, backing vocals
 Peter Cetera - bass, backing vocals
 Danny Seraphine - drums, percussion
 Jimmy Pankow - trombone
 Lee Loughnane - trumpet
 Walter Parazaider - alto saxophone

References

External links
 

1969 singles
1971 singles
Chicago (band) songs
Songs written by Robert Lamm
Song recordings produced by James William Guercio
Columbia Records singles
1969 songs